Italy competed at the 1984 European Athletics Indoor Championships in Gothenburg, Sweden, from 3 to 4 March 1984.

Medalists

Top eight
14 Italian athletes reached the top eight in this edition of the championships.
Men

Women

See also
 Italy national athletics team

References

External links
 EAA official site 

1984
1984 European Athletics Indoor Championships
1984 in Italian sport